Chalcocopris is a genus of Scarabaeidae or scarab beetle.

References

Scarabaeidae genera